ShadowWraith is a top-down view scrolling shooter video game created by American studio Terminal Sunset for the Macintosh, and published by StarPlay. This game has a sequel called Souls in the System.

As of December 2002, the StarPlay online product catalog indicated that the company was no longer selling games directly.

Story
In the game, the player assumes the role of an artificial intelligence representation of a man named Alex Kendall, who was assassinated for having associations with the Defense Department. Before his annihilation, Kendall's work in the Defense Department had grown unsatisfying for him, and so he instead devoted his time and efforts to the expansion of the ever growing cyberspace. In his latest project, he had created a way of designing a person's ego into the net, with such a cybernetic ego incorporating personality and intelligence in addition to tactile senses, using his own as a prototype. His attempt at doing so was a success, though Kendall never got a chance to reveal his findings to the world, as he was killed shortly after, awaking to see his family die at the hands of his murderers. Soon afterwards, Kendall's mind came to life again in the form of a cyberspace program.

Throughout the game, the player controls Alex Kendall's cyberspace program of himself, seeking revenge of his family, and his own mortal self. The phrase "Revenge is best served on the Net" is shown in the opening titles before game play commences.

Soundtrack
The soundtrack for ShadowWraith is widely considered among the greatest video game soundtracks of all time and was composed by Steven Allen, Andrew Schlesinger, Volker Tripp, and Thomas Chenhall, with the songs being stored in MOD format. It consisted of the following song titles in alleged order of game play:

Extend
Into the Shadow
Haunt
Night
Cyberride
Fall
Wraith
Marshins
Dance of Zax
Overlord
World
Ryu
Stardust (Memories)
Oblivion
Silntrac (Silent Racer)
Elysium
Molecule (Molecule's Revenge)
DENSETSU
Pulse
Off Line Pulse
Dance Factory
Internal Impactor
Evergladez
Space
Xenon

Reception
Inside Mac Games complimented the game on its detailed physics model and music, among other things, and commented that ShadowWraith was better than the other games in its genre, though there were slight difficulties with switching weapons during gameplay and slower performance on 68030-based Macs.

References

External links
 Overview of ShadowWraith by Lisa Karen Savignano at Allgame (archived resource)
 ShadowWraith FAQ at StarPlay Technical Support (archived resource)

1995 video games
Classic Mac OS games
Classic Mac OS-only games
Scrolling shooters
Video games developed in the United States